The Directorate General of Civil Aviation (Turkish: Sivil Havacılık Genel Müdürlüğü) is the aviation regulator for Turkey. The organization, which was formed in 1954, handles the registration of Unmanned aerial vehicles and civil aircraft. The organization also conducts the investigations of aviation accidents in the airspace of Turkey.

Investigations 

 Atlasjet Flight 4203

References 

Government agencies of Turkey
Turkey
Turkey
Aviation organizations based in Turkey
Civil Aviation
Civil aviation in Turkey